The Arade is a river located in the region of the Algarve, southern Portugal. the river's course takes it through the municipalities of Silves, Lagoa and Portimão. The source of the river lies to the southwest of the Serra do Caldeirão mountain ridge, in a valley called Barranco do Pé do Coelho. The mouth of the river empties into the Atlantic Ocean between the city of Portimão and the freguesia of Ferragudo, in Lagoa Municipality.

Nowadays only small boats can go that far.

Dams
Part of the reason for the present low water flow (and subsequent silting up) of the river has been the erection of two dams in the middle reaches of the river—the Barragem (Dam) de Arade and above it the Barragem do Funcho.

References

Rivers of the Algarve
Rivers of Portugal